Freckleton Pool or Dow Brook is a tributary of the River Ribble running through the Fylde plain in Lancashire, England, passing the towns of Kirkham and Freckleton west of Preston.

Rivers of Lancashire
Borough of Fylde
1Freckleton